Diego Antonio Gómez Pickering (born 1977) is a Mexican diplomat and writer, who served from December 2013 to June 2016 as Mexico's Ambassador to the United Kingdom. From June 2016 to November 2018 he served as the Consul-General of Mexico in New York City.

On 13 May 2014, Gómez Pickering presented his credentials to Queen Elizabeth II at Buckingham Palace accrediting him as Mexico's representative to the United Kingdom.

In March 2015 he was part of the Mexican State visit of President Enrique Peña Nieto to the United Kingdom. He was appointed an Honorary Knight Commander of the Royal Victorian Order.

References 

1977 births
Living people
Mexican people of English descent
Instituto Tecnológico Autónomo de México alumni
Columbia University alumni
Academic staff of Jawaharlal Nehru University
Ambassadors of Mexico to the United Kingdom
Honorary Knights Commander of the Royal Victorian Order